Leonid Telegin (Doctor of Technical Sciences (Sc.D.), Professor, distinguished scientist in the gas facilities organizing construction field.

Youth 
In 1950, Leonid Telegin graduated from high school with a silver medal, becoming the first medal holder. Later, by the decision of the pedagogical council of 06/21/1950, he was nominated for a gold medal, but did not receive it, as he was repressed.

Career 
Leonid Telegin began his career as the head of the department of "Orggas" trust, Ministry of Public Utilities of the RSFSR, then worked at the Ministry of Gas Industry of the USSR. As the head of the mechanized shaft, Leonid Telegin built trunk pipelines, held the position of a chief engineer of Construction Department N3 at "Omskneftteprovodstroy" trust, as well as senior engineer at the Department of construction of oil product pipelines of the Ministry.

Since 1969, Leonid Telegin started career at Gubkin Russian State University of Oil and Gas. He was a lecturer, associate professor and a professor at the department of "Construction of oil and gas pipelines and storages". During the years of his work at the university, he was a mentor of seven doctors and thirty candidates of technical sciences, published more than three hundred articles that included seven monographs. Telegin was also a member of scientific and technical council of the oil and gas complex, an expert of the tender committee of Gazprom.

Awards and honors 
Leonid Telegin's contribution in the development of  domestic pipeline transport of oil and gas was honored by the  government awards, the prize named after Ivan Gubkin as well as awards given by the USSR Ministry of Higher Education.

References

External links 
 Телегин, Леонид Гаврилович - Охрана окружающей среды при сооружении и эксплуатации газонефтепроводов from Russian State Library website
 Телегин Леонид Гаврилович - Публикации

Soviet engineers

1932 births
Living people